Calcutta Tramways Workers' and Employees' Union is a trade union of workers at the Kolkata tramway. CTW&EU is affiliated to the Centre of Indian Trade Unions. CTW&EU was founded in 1975.

Trade unions in India
Centre of Indian Trade Unions
Trade unions in Indian Railways
Trade unions in West Bengal
Trade unions established in 1975
1975 establishments in West Bengal